Vinica may refer to places:

Places
Vinica, Tomislavgrad, Bosnia and Herzegovina
Vinica, Varaždin County, Croatia
Vinica, North Macedonia
Vinica Municipality, North Macedonia
Vinica, Veľký Krtíš District, Slovakia
Vinica, Črnomelj, Slovenia
Cetore, Izola Municipality, Slovenia, known as Vinica from 1957 to 1988

See also
Vinice, Slovenia
Vinnytsia, Ukraine
Vinnytsia Raion, Vinnytsia Oblast, Ukraine
Vinnytsia Oblast, Ukraine
Winnica (disambiguation), several places in Poland